Marina Bay is a bay located in the Central Area of Singapore, surrounded by the perimeter of four other planning areas, the Downtown Core, Marina East, Marina South and Straits View. The area surrounding the bay itself, also called Marina Bay, is a 360 hectare extension to the adjacent Central Business District. It is also the new downtown of Singapore, built on reclaimed land.

Buildings include Gardens by the Bay, the Marina Bay Sands, Marina Bay Financial Centre, Asia Square, The Sail @ Marina Bay and Marina One integrated mixed-use developments. It is one of the key focus areas by the Urban Redevelopment Authority. Marina Bay is envisioned by the URA as a work-live-play vibrant 24-hour CBD.

Master Plan
The Urban Redevelopment Authority (URA) Master Plan for Marina Bay aims to encourage a mix of uses for this area, including commercial, residential, hotel and entertainment.

History

In 1969, land reclamation work to create 360 hectares of prime waterfront site began at Marina Bay. The reclaimed land forms what is today the Marina Centre and Marina South areas, and the reclamation work was completed in 1992. In the reclamation process,  Inner/Outer Basins (anchorage area for commercial and naval vessels), Telok Ayer Basin (now site of Asia Square Tower 1 and 2) and Inner Roads was removed from the map by reclaiming land, while the Singapore River's mouth now flows into the bay instead of directly into the sea.

The long term visions for the Marina Bay area were first articulated in the 1983 Master Plan by the  Urban Redevelopment Authority (URA), with the waterfront areas being deliberately kept open to the public. In 1988, the draft plan for Marina Bay was presented to the public in a two-week exhibition where it set out the objectives for the development, among which are optimising the waterfront location and creating a distinctive image with international landmarks that could become a focal point for the city.

The URA Master Plan for Marina Bay aims to encourage a mix of uses for this area, including commercial, residential, hotel and entertainment and to turn it into a work-live-play vibrant 24-hour CBD. In 2005, the Urban Redevelopment Authority spent $400,000 on a branding exercise to name the Marina Bay area in order to sell the new major developments in the area, only to settle with the original name "Marina Bay".

The Singapore government also spent $35 million to complete the 3.5 km Waterfront Promenade around Marina Bay. It includes a new eco-friendly visitor centre and the Helix Bridge linking Bayfront to Marina Centre where the Youth Olympic Park is located. The Promontory @ Marina Bay (formerly Central Promontory Site) will be used as an interim event and public space used for activities such as theatres and carnivals.

In 2008, Marina Barrage was built, converting the basin into a freshwater Marina Reservoir.

Events at Marina Bay

Since its construction in 2007, The Float@Marina Bay has hosted events such as the National Day Parade, New Year's Eve Countdown and Singapore Fireworks Celebrations, and also serves as a spectator stand for the Singapore Grand Prix. Furthermore, it also played host to the Opening and Closing Ceremonies of the inaugural 2010 Summer Youth Olympics.

The area also hosts the annual i Light Marina Bay, a sustainable light art festival.

The event space next to Marina Bay Sands, known as The Lawn, hosted the first overseas and Singapore edition of ArtBox Bangkok on two separate weekends, 14–16 April and 21–23 April 2017.

Infrastructure
The Singapore government pumped nearly S$2 billion (about US$1.2 billion) to build the infrastructural base for Marina Bay, which includes the Marina Barrage, increased connectivity to the MRT, and the new Marina Promenade and Helix Bridge.

Common Services Tunnel
The Common Services Tunnel is a development of the Marina Bay area in Singapore. It is said to be the second of its kind in Asia after Japan. This utility tunnel houses telecom cables, power lines, water pipes as well as provision for pneumatic refuse collection pipes. The  phase one of the tunnel has cost about S$81 million (about US$51 million) while  phase two, cost around S$137 million (about US$86 million).

District cooling 
SP Group's subsidiary, Singapore District Cooling, started operating Singapore’s first district cooling plant, supplying chilled water supplies to One Raffles Quay in May 2006. A second district cooling plant was commissioned in May 2010, which will supply chilled water for the air-conditioning of buildings in the area through pipes housed within the Common Services Tunnel, according to the report. Built at a cost of some S$110 million (about US$69 million), the second district cooling plant will be able to serve 1.25 million square metres of gross floor area and free up space which should be used for building chiller plants and cooling towers for separate buildings. The second district cooling plant started operations on 3 March 2016.

Water management
In 2004, the Public Utilities Board announced plans to construct a new downtown reservoir by damming the Marina Channel. This barrage was completed in 2008. Known as the Marina Barrage, it turned Marina Bay and the Kallang Basin into a confined freshwater reservoir with limited access to marine transportation to regulate the water quality. The new reservoir provides another source of drinking water for Singapore, as well as a stable water level for a variety of water activities and events. The barrage also prevents flooding in the Chinatown area.

Transport
There are currently eight rail stations: City Hall, Raffles Place, Marina Bay, Bayfront, Downtown, Telok Ayer, Esplanade and Promenade serving Marina Bay. As the plan set out, by 2020, the 360 hectares of Marina Bay boasts a comprehensive transport network as Singapore's most rail-connected district. The first three new MRT lines (Circle line, Downtown line) opened between 2012 and 2013. By 2018, the Marina Bay district had more than six MRT stations, all no more than five minutes of each other. The Thomson–East Coast MRT line created better connections within Marina South, opened in 2022. A pedestrian network links developments and MRT stations. Within greater Marina Bay, water taxis will even double up as an alternative mode of transport.

Key developments

In Marina Bay

 ArtScience Museum
 Asia Square
 Bayfront Bridge
 Circle line
 Clifford Pier
 Common Services Tunnel
 Conrad Centennial Singapore
 Downtown line
 Esplanade – Theatres on the Bay
 F1 Pit Building
 Gardens by the Bay
 Marina Bay Street Circuit
 The Fullerton Heritage Precinct: Customs House, The Fullerton Hotel Singapore, The Fullerton Waterboat House, One Fullerton, Fullerton Bay Hotel
 The Helix Bridge
 Marina Barrage
 Marina Bay Cruise Centre Singapore
 Marina Bay Financial Centre
 Marina Bay Golf Course
 Marina Bay Link Mall
 Marina Bay MRT station
 Marina Bay Sands
 Marina Bay Suites
 Marina Coastal Expressway
 Marina South Pier
 Marina South Pier MRT station
 Marina Square
 Millenia Walk
 North South line
 One Marina Boulevard
 One Raffles Quay
 One Shenton Way
 OUE Bayfront
 Singapore Flyer
 Suntec City
 The Float @ Marina Bay
 The Lawn @ Marina Bay
 The Promontory @ Marina Bay (formerly Central Promontory Site)
 The Sail @ Marina Bay
 Thomson–East Coast line
 Youth Olympic Park

Other places of interest

The 101-hectare Gardens by the Bay site is made up of Bay South Garden, Bay East Garden, and Bay Central Garden across the mouth of the Singapore River. All three gardens will be interconnected via a series of pedestrian bridges to form a larger loop along the whole waterfront and linked to surrounding developments, open public spaces, transport nodes and attractions.
A 3.5 km waterfront promenade linking the attractions at the Marina Centre, Collyer Quay and Bayfront areas was completed in 2010.

Gallery

See also
 Downtown Core
 Future developments in Singapore
 Marina Centre
 Marina South

References

External links

 
 Urban Redevelopment Authority Official Website

 
Downtown Core (Singapore)
Places in Singapore
Bays of the Pacific Ocean